The Alamosa–Durango line or San Juan extension was a railroad line built by the Denver and Rio Grande Western Railroad, following the border between the U.S. states of Colorado and New Mexico, in the Rocky Mountains. The line was originally built as a  narrow-gauge line between Alamosa, Colorado, and Durango, Colorado. Portions of the route survive to this day: the now standard-gauged segment from Alamosa to Antonito, Colorado, and a narrow-gauge portion from Antonito to Chama, New Mexico.

History
Following the Railroad Wars between the Denver and Rio Grande and the Atchison, Topeka and Santa Fe Railway(Santa Fe), the D&RG signed an agreement with the Santa Fe, where the Santa Fe agreed not to compete with the D&RG's plans to build an extension into the San Juan Valley.  The  rail line was built in the early 1880s to access the various mineral resources in south-western Colorado. In 1881, the line reached Durango and a short time later, a branch was built up the Animas river valley to the mining town of Silverton. In addition to the ore traffic, lumber and various agricultural commodities were also hauled along the route.

The 20th century 
When the D&RGW began the process of converting most of their mainlines to standard gauge in the early 1900s, the railroad had also planned to convert the San Juan extension. As a result, the section from Alamosa to Antonito was converted to dual gauge in 1901 with the addition of a standard gauge only branch from Durango south to Farmington, New Mexico a few years later. The D&RGW had also considered building a tunnel under Cumbres Pass which would have alleviated the steep 4% grade over the pass. However, with the decline in ore traffic during the early 20th century, the railroad scrapped these plans and the Farmington branch was converted to narrow-gauge in 1923. After World War II, many of the surrounding Narrow gauge lines closed due to lack of Traffic. However the San Juan Extension experienced an unexpected "boom" in freight traffic due to growth in the oil industry around Farmington. This increase provided the necessary revenue to keep the line operating into the 1960s.

Abandonment and preservation 
By the mid-1960s, traffic had once again dwindled and in 1968, the D&RGW sought to abandon the entire route. The D&RGW never introduced mainline diesel traction on their narrow-gauge lines, as narrow-gauge locomotives would have to be custom-built at significant additional cost. Thus, the Alamosa–Durango line eventually became of the last locations in the United States where steam locomotives were still in regular use. This brought recognition that all, if not some portion, of the line should be preserved as a museum or heritage railway. In 1970, a 64-mile segment between Antonito and Chama was purchased by the states of Colorado and New Mexico, and subsequently began operating excursion trains under the name of Cumbres and Toltec Scenic Railroad.

Meanwhile, the rest of the route from Chama to Durango, including the Farmington branch, was abandoned and the dual-gauge Alamosa–Antonito section was converted to a traditional 2-rail standard-gauge line, becoming the last 3-rail portion of the D&RGW system to be eliminated.

The San Juan extension today 
Portions of the Alamosa–Durango line survive to this day. The now standard-gauged section from Alamosa to Antonito remained under ownership by the D&RGW and its successor railroads until the line was sold to RailAmerica in 2003. Today, the line is part of the San Luis and Rio Grande Railroad, a class III railroad which also operates a seasonal excursion service.

The narrow-gauge portion between Antontio and Chama continues to operate as the Cumbres & Toltec Scenic Railroad with two trains (one in each direction) traversing the route each day during summer months.

At the ghost town of Pagosa Junction, also known as Gato, a small portion of narrow-gauge track along with a steel truss bridge are still in place.

Tracks Across Borders 
Since the mid-2010s, the area along the now abandoned narrow-gauge portion between Chama and Durango has been in the process of being promoted as a scenic byway known as Tracks Across Borders. The byway, approved on April 16, 2015, follows a series of US, State, and County highways through the communities in Colorado and New Mexico that the railroad once served.

Operations 
During the early years, freight trains over the Alamosa–Durango line were handled by the D&RGW's fleet of  steam locomotives while passenger services were worked by the railroad's  and  locomotives. In later years, these were gradually superseded when more powerful  type engines were introduced.

Cumbres turn 
Because of the 4% grade on the west side of Cumbres Pass, most eastbound freight trains performed what was known as the "Cumbres turn". After arriving at Chama, a train would be broken up and hauled in sections up to Cumbres where it was then reassembled before continuing its journey. On other portions of the route, freights were operated either by double heading or with a helper engine.

Branch lines 
The Alamosa–Durango line was host to several branch lines which diverted from various points along the route to connect nearby towns and industries. Among these were:

Silverton branch 

Opened in 1882, the 45-mile route from Durango to Silverton was built by the D&RGW to serve the mining industries in the San Juans. Almost abandoned in the 1960s, the branch was retained by the D&RGW to serve the tourist industry and the railroad operated a seasonal passenger service during summer months. In 1981, the route was sold to Charles E. Bradshaw Jr. who then operated the branch as the Durango and Silverton Narrow Gauge Railroad. The line is currently owned by American Heritage Railways.

Santa Fe branch 

The Santa Fe branch, also known as the Chili line or Española branch, ran southwards for 125 miles from Antonito to Santa Fe, New Mexico. It was built by the D&RGW during the 1880s as part of a planned rail link with El Paso, Texas. However, construction didn't go beyond Española due to a dispute with the nearby Atchison, Topeka and Santa Fe Railway. In 1887, the last 35 miles from Española to Santa Fe was opened by the Texas, Santa Fe & Northern Railroad, a subsidiary of the D&RGW. The entire route was closed in 1941 and subsequently abandoned.

Farmington branch 
When completed in 1905, the 47 mile Farmington branch was unusual in that it was built as a standard gauge line which resulted in Durango having dual gauge facilities. It was converted to 3 ft gauge in the 1920s after plans to standard gauge the Alamosa–Durango line fell through. This branch lasted until the late 1960s when the D&RGW ended its narrow gauge freight operations from Alamosa to Durango.

Pagosa branch 
This branch was constructed in the late 1890s to serve the logging industry around Pagosa Springs. At 30.7 miles, this was the shortest of the D&RGW's major branch lines on the San Juan extension. It was also the shortest-lived; closure took place in the mid-1930s.

References

External links
Historic American Engineering Record documentation, all filed under Chama, Rio Arriba County, NM:

Denver and Rio Grande Western Railroad
Historic American Engineering Record in New Mexico
3 ft gauge railways in the United States
Closed railway lines in the United States